Mount Erebus is a  mountain summit located near one of the most beautiful mountain meccas in the world, the Tonquin Valley of Jasper National Park in Alberta, Canada. Mount Erebus is composed of sedimentary rock laid down during the Cambrian period, then was pushed east and over the top of younger rock during the Laramide orogeny. Its nearest higher peak is Mount Fraser,  to the northwest. The mountain's north ridge terminates at Outpost Peak.


History

The mountain's name was applied in 1916 by Morrison P. Bridgland (1878–1948), a Dominion Land Surveyor who named many peaks in Jasper Park and the Canadian Rockies. Bridgland was impressed with the dark colored cliffs of the northeast face of the mountain. The Greek word for darkness is erebus. The mountain is located at the west margin of the Tonquin Valley, which is also named for another ill-fated ship, .

The first ascent of the mountain was made in 1924 by L. Coolidge, G. Higginsnon, J. E. Johnson, and guide A. Streich.

The mountain's name was officially adopted in 1935 when approved by the Geographical Names Board of Canada.

Climate

Based on the Köppen climate classification, Mount Erebus is located in a subarctic climate zone with cold, snowy winters, and mild summers. Temperatures can drop below  with wind chill factors below . This climate supports the Fraser Glacier on the northwest slope, and the Eremite Glacier on the northeast slope. In terms of favorable weather, July and August present the best months for climbing. Precipitation runoff from Mount Erebus drains into the Astoria River and Whirlpool River, both tributaries of the Athabasca River.

References

External links
 Weather forecast: Mount Erebus
 Parks Canada web site: Jasper National Park
 Mount Erebus photo: SummitSearch
 Mount Erebus' neighborhood photo: SummitSearch

Mountains of Jasper National Park
Three-thousanders of Alberta
Canadian Rockies